"Thinking of You" is a song by American duo Loggins and Messina. It was released in 1973 as the second single from their second album, Loggins and Messina.  The uptempo rendition released on the single is different from the somewhat more mellow LP mix.

"Thinking of You" reached number 18 on the U.S. Billboard Hot 100 and number 11 on the Cash Box Top 100. It reached number 20 in Canada.

The song was a bigger Adult Contemporary hit, reaching number seven in the U.S. and number 16 in Canada.  The track speaks of the essence of partnership, and of the joy found while spending time in each other's company.

Personnel
 Jim Messina – lead vocals, electric guitars
 Kenny Loggins – harmony vocals, classical acoustic guitar, harmonica
 Al Garth – fiddle, recorder(?)
 Jon Clarke – oboe, recorder(?)
 Larry Sims – bass, backing vocals
 Merel Bregante – brushed drums, possible backing vocals
 Michael Omartian – clavinet, Wurlitzer electric piano
 Milt Holland – castanets, temple blocks
It is unclear if it is Garth or Clarke who overdubbed the recorder.

Chart performance

Weekly singles charts

Year-end charts

References

External links
  

1973 singles
Columbia Records singles
1972 songs
Songs written by Jim Messina (musician)
Loggins and Messina songs